Haldex Traction is a manufacturer of intelligent all-wheel drive (AWD) systems, founded in Sweden. Since invention of Gen I in 1998, the company produced several generations of products licensed to and customized for some major automotive brands, that in turn have marketed Haldex Traction AWD under different names. On 17 December 2010, American-based BorgWarner announced that it had signed an agreement to acquire the Traction Systems division of Haldex AB. BorgWarner completed the acquisition of the Traction Systems division on 1 February 2011. Haldex Traction Systems was incorporated in BorgWarner TorqTransfer Systems.

Product history

First generation – 1998
The Haldex Coupling made its first appearance in the Audi TT, Audi S3 8L and VW Golf with an electronically controlled hydraulic-mechanical all-wheel drive concept. This system attempts to engage the rear wheels when the front wheels start to slip.

Second generation – 2001
The second generation of Haldex coupling is an electronically controlled permanent 4x4 system with a Haldex differential calculating how much drive should be directed to the rear wheels. The Haldex system automatically distributes power between the front and rear wheels depending on slippage, but normally sends 95% of the power to the front wheels.

Third generation – 2006
The third generation of Haldex coupling made its appearance on the newly re-designed Land Rover Freelander 2 (LR2 in the United States). With enhanced capabilities, it is aimed at providing a more immediate off-road response.

This generation of Haldex coupling is later shared with Volvo's complete lineup (Manufactured 2005–2008, depending on model) and is called "Instant Traction" in documentation by Volvo.

Fourth generation – 2007
Saab introduced a combination of Haldex Couplings on its 9-3 Turbo-X in late 2007, called XWD (Cross-Wheel Drive). This was later introduced to the rest of Saab's lineup including the 9-3, 9-3X, 9-5 and 9-4X.

Fifth generation
On 16 April 2009 Haldex announced a deal worth SEK4.5B (approx US$530M) to provide Volkswagen with a new AWD system for the company's new modular platform due in 2012. The GenV AWD coupling, now distributed by BorgWarner TorqTransfer Systems, features a new design aimed at reducing vehicle complexity and simplifying integration into the drivetrain. A new electro-hydraulic clutch actuator uses a centrifugal overflow valve design aimed at accurately distributing power between the front and rear axles, and eliminating the need for an accumulator, solenoid valve and filter. It also employs an integrated electronic control unit.

Vehicles equipped with Haldex AWD

The Haldex all-wheel drive system is currently used in the following vehicle models:

 Volkswagen Group (Volkswagen AG)
 Audi A3 quattro
 Audi S3
 Audi RS3
 Audi Q3
 Audi TT quattro
 SEAT León 4
 SEAT Altea Freetrack 4
 SEAT Alhambra 4
SEAT Ateca 4x4 
 Škoda Octavia 4x4
 Škoda Superb 4x4
 Škoda Yeti 4x4 (Haldex Fourth Gen)
 Škoda Yeti Outdoor 4x4 (Haldex Fifth Gen)
 Škoda Kodiaq 4x4 (Haldex Fifth Gen)
 Škoda Karoq 4x4 (Haldex Fifth Gen)
 VW Golf R
 VW Bora 4motion
 VW New Beetle RSi
 VW Passat 4motion B6 Platform
 VW CC 4motion
 VW Sharan 4motion
 VW Tiguan
 VW Golf IV 4motion
 VW Multivan 4motion
 VW Caddy 4motion
 VW Transporter 4motion
 Lamborghini Sesto Elemento
 Lamborghini Huracán LP 610-4
 Lamborghini Huracán LP 640-4 Performante
 Lamborghini Huracán EVO
 Lamborghini Huracán Sterrato
 Lamborghini Aventador LP 700-4
 Lamborghini Aventador SuperVeloce LP 750-4
 Lamborghini Aventador S LP 740-4
 Lamborghini Aventador SVJ 770-4
 Lamborghini Aventador LP 780-4 Ultimae
 Lamborghini Veneno
 Lamborghini Centenario
 Lamborghini Sián FKP 37
 Lamborghini Countach LPI 800-4
 Bugatti Veyron
 Bugatti Chiron
 Volvo Cars
 Volvo S40 AWD
 Volvo V40 Cross Country AWD
 Volvo V50 AWD
 Volvo S60 AWD
 Volvo V60 AWD
 Volvo V60 Polestar
 Volvo S60R AWD (Second Gen 2004–2005, Third Gen 2006–2007)
 Volvo XC60 AWD (Haldex Fourth Gen)
 Volvo V70 AWD (Third Gen 2008–2009, Fourth Gen 2010–2012, Fifth Gen 2013 -) 
 Volvo V70R AWD (Second Gen 2004–2005, Third Gen 2006–2007)
 Volvo XC70 (Second Gen 2003–2005, Third Gen 2006+)
 Volvo S80 AWD
 Volvo XC90 AWD (Second Gen <2005, Third Gen 2006+)
 Ford
 Ford Taurus
 Ford Mondeo (US: Ford Fusion)
 Ford Freestyle
 Ford Kuga (US: Ford Escape)
 Mercury Montego
 Land Rover
Land Rover Freelander 2/LR2
Land Rover Discovery Sport
Land Rover Range Rover Evoque (Haldex Fourth Gen until 2013)
 Saab Automobile
 Saab 9-3 Turbo X (2007–2008) (Haldex Fourth Gen with eLSD)
 Saab 9-3 Aero Saab XWD (2008–2010) (Haldex Fourth Gen with eLSD)
 Saab 9-3 XWD 2.0T (2009), Turbo4 (2011) (Haldex Fourth Gen without eLSD)
 Saab 9-3 9-3X (2010) (Haldex Fourth Gen with eLSD)
 Saab 9-5 Turbo6 (2011) (Haldex Fourth Gen without eLSD)
 Saab 9-5 Aero (2010) (Haldex Fourth Gen with eLSD)
 Saab 9-4X XWD (Haldex Fourth Gen with eLSD)
 GM
Opel Insignia (US) Buick Regal(Haldex Fourth Gen.without eLSD)
Buick Lacrosse (Haldex Fourth Gen.)
Cadillac SRX (Haldex Fourth Gen.)

See also
 Haldex (company)

References

External links
Haldex website
https://archive.today/20130410162049/http://www.borgwarner.com/en/torqtransfer/default.aspx/

Four-wheel drive layout